The 1905–06 Rugby Union County Championship was the 18th edition of England's premier rugby union club competition at the time.

Devon won the competition for the third time defeating Durham in the final. It was Durham's seventh consecutive final appearance, Adamson was carried off and taken to hospital leaving Durham with just fourteen players for the majority of the game.

Final

See also
 English rugby union system
 Rugby union in England

References

Rugby Union County Championship
County Championship (rugby union) seasons